Sean Miguel Morrison (born October 4, 1983 in San Fernando) is a male beach volleyball and volleyball player from Trinidad and Tobago.
He played in the men's competition at the NORCECA Beach Volleyball Circuit 2007 in Guatemala City, partnering with Christian Francois and finishing in 12th place.

Partnering Nolan Tash, he played in the 2003 Pan American Games beach volleyball competitions, finishing in 13th position.

In Indoor volleyball, he participated in the Pan-American Cup 2006 and 2008 with his National team.

Clubs
  Rockets (1998–2000)
  Glamorgans (2000–2007)
  Technocrats(2000–present)

Awards

Beach & Indoor
 Trinidad and Tobago Beach Volleyball Championship 2003,2006,2007,  Gold Medal
 player of the year 2001 and 2004 
 won a total of 10 National  Championships with Glamorgan & Technocrats, won MVP, best spiker, best blocker, best receiver each year. 
 Won 3 consecutive pro league with Technocrats
 Coached at 2014 Youth Olympics China

References

 
 

1983 births
Living people
Trinidad and Tobago men's volleyball players
Trinidad and Tobago beach volleyball players
Men's beach volleyball players
Beach volleyball players at the 2003 Pan American Games
Pan American Games competitors for Trinidad and Tobago
People from San Fernando, Trinidad and Tobago